South Georgia Tormenta FC Women is an American women's soccer team, that began play in 2022 in USL W League. They are an affiliate of South Georgia Tormenta FC, a men's team in the USL League One.

History 
On June 8, 2021, it was announced that Tormenta would be one of the eight founding members of the new league. Tormenta FC women will play their home games at Optim Health System Field, currently under construction in Statesboro, Georgia.

Tormenta FC won the inaugural USL W League Championship, defeating Minnesota Aurora FC 2-1 (aet) on July 23, 2022.

Roster

Record

Year-by-year

Head coaches
 Includes Regular Season and Playoffs. Excludes friendlies.

Honors
  USL W League
 Champions: 2022
 South Central Division Winner: 2022

Player honors

See also 
 Tormenta FC
 Tormenta FC 2

References 

Tormenta FC
Women's soccer clubs in the United States
Soccer clubs in Georgia (U.S. state)
2021 establishments in Georgia (U.S. state)
Association football clubs established in 2021
USL W League teams